Donoso is a surname. Notable people with the surname include:

Gabriel Donoso (1960–2006), Chilean polo player
Guille Donoso (born 1995), Spanish footballer
Humberto Donoso (1938–2000), Chilean footballer
José Donoso (1924–1996), Chilean writer
José Jiménez Donoso (c. 1632–1690), Spanish architect and painter
Juan Donoso Cortés (1809–1853), Spanish author, conservative, Catholic political theorist and diplomat
Juan de la Cruz Donoso (1805–1859), Chilean politician and journalist
Lino Donoso (1922–1990), Cuban baseball player
Luz Donoso (1921–2008), Chilean graphic artist, muralist, political activist, and teacher
Marcela Donoso (born 1961), Chilean painter
Matías Donoso (born 1986), Chilean footballer
Mauricio Donoso (born 1976), Chilean footballer
Mauro Donoso (born 1971), Chilean footballer
Pablo Donoso (born 1984), Chilean racing driver
Ruperto Donoso (1914–2001), Chilean-born American jockey